Zawidowice may refer to the following places in Poland:
Zawidowice, Lower Silesian Voivodeship (south-west Poland)
Zawidowice, Greater Poland Voivodeship (west-central Poland)